Enchant is a hamlet in southern Alberta, Canada within the Municipal District of Taber. It is located on Highway 526 and the Canadian Pacific Railway, between Vauxhall and Lomond.

The hamlet is located in census division No. 2 and in the federal riding of Medicine Hat.

Enchant was once incorporated as a village but was dissolved from village status on February 1, 1945. The railroad arrived in 1914 and the first grain elevator was completed in 1915.

Demographics 
The Municipal District of Taber's 2016 municipal census counted a population of 259 in Enchant, a  change from the hamlet's 2013 municipal census population of 289.

See also 
List of communities in Alberta
List of former urban municipalities in Alberta
List of hamlets in Alberta

References 

Hamlets in Alberta
Former villages in Alberta
Municipal District of Taber